Waimataitai is a suburb of Timaru, in the South Canterbury district and Canterbury region of New Zealand's South Island.

Demographics

Waimataitai-Maori Hill had a population of 2,043 at the 2018 New Zealand census, an increase of 141 people (7.4%) since the 2013 census, and an increase of 156 people (8.3%) since the 2006 census. There were 912 households. There were 969 males and 1,071 females, giving a sex ratio of 0.9 males per female. The median age was 45.8 years (compared with 37.4 years nationally), with 318 people (15.6%) aged under 15 years, 342 (16.7%) aged 15 to 29, 903 (44.2%) aged 30 to 64, and 480 (23.5%) aged 65 or older.

Ethnicities were 88.7% European/Pākehā, 9.0% Māori, 2.1% Pacific peoples, 6.3% Asian, and 1.8% other ethnicities (totals add to more than 100% since people could identify with multiple ethnicities).

The proportion of people born overseas was 17.2%, compared with 27.1% nationally.

Although some people objected to giving their religion, 47.0% had no religion, 41.0% were Christian, 2.2% were Hindu, 0.1% were Muslim, 0.3% were Buddhist and 1.8% had other religions.

Of those at least 15 years old, 282 (16.3%) people had a bachelor or higher degree, and 423 (24.5%) people had no formal qualifications. The median income was $30,800, compared with $31,800 nationally. The employment status of those at least 15 was that 825 (47.8%) people were employed full-time, 246 (14.3%) were part-time, and 45 (2.6%) were unemployed.

Economy

Retail

Northtown Mall opened at Waimataitai in the 1970s. It was upgraded in 2016, and includes a Pak'nSave supermarket.

A number of chain stores have their Timaru branches at Waimataitai, including Briscoes, and Supercheap Auto. There are a number of fast food outlets in the area, including McDonald's, KFC, Domino's Pizza and Pizza Hut.

Education 

References

Suburbs of Timaru